Campus Radio Online was a Metro Manila FM radio station and Internet radio station provided by a joint venture of two veteran former Campus Radio DJs (John Hendrix and the Triggerman) and Pangasinan-based eRadioPortal powered by Bitstop Network Services. The main format was Top 40/CHR and OPM.

This was previously heard on DWLS-FM from 1992 to 2007 (now known as Barangay LS 97.1), and then on DWRT-FM from March to August 2008.

Most Campus Radio provincial stations in the Philippines, under GMA Network subsidiary RGMA, however, continue to exist as Hot AC ("masa") stations (later rebranded as Barangay FM provincial stations on February 17, 2014 to become a single brand of all RGMA FM radio stations).

History

DWLS-FM (1992-2007)
When GMA was renamed as the "Rainbow Satellite Network" in early 1992, the station was reformatted on April 30, 1992 as Campus Radio 97.1 WLS FM, with a Top 40 format. This was to target teens & early adults. Its notable programs were the longest-running program on the station, the legendary "Top 20 at 12" (anchored by Milo Cavarlez aka The Triggerman, which was first heard on Kiss FM 101.1 (now 101.1 Yes The Best), where the top 20 songs of the day were counted down in the mold of BBC Radio 1's The Official Chart Show at noontime, and "Campus Aircheck", an institution of sorts for aspiring DJs to get hired by Campus Radio, touted as "the first school on the air".

In 1995, when Mike Enriquez took over the radio operations, Campus Radio was reformatted to a contemporary MOR format, earning its slogan "Forever!". At this time, a few programs were introduced, notably the Message Center, wherein one's message must not be a greeting. By the end of 1999, it shifted back to Top 40. During their heydays as an English-language radio station, they used jingles designed for the station by JAM Creative Productions.

As Campus 99.5 (2008)
The Campus branding was resurfaced to the 99.5 frequency as 99.5 Campus FM on Easter Sunday, March 23, 2008, with some of the announcers coming from Barangay LS 97.1 (formerly "Campus Radio 97.1") and some of the retained Hit FM jocks.  The new incarnation of 99.5 reflected the spirit of the former Campus Radio.  Early in May, 2008, it was renamed Campus 99.5. The on-air format was essentially the same, with familiar programs and segments and jocks from Campus Radio 97.1 re-introduced later on.

On the afternoon of August 14 at 4:00 pm, the management abruptly discontinued Campus 99.5, due to management difficulties. The station then switched to an automated all-music format with only pre-recorded station ID's played intermittently between songs. The BrewRats program continued on its usual schedule until August 21, after which it went on a one-week hiatus. On August 24, a new set of stingers announced that a new format and station image would be premiered in days before the station itself reverted to 99.5 RT on September 1, 2008.

As an Internet station (2009-2011)
After several months, Campus Radio returned, this time as an Internet station since March 2009. It was officially relaunched during the U.P. Fair at the UP Diliman. The station is currently inactive.

References

External links
Campus Radio Online at PinoyExchange

1986 establishments in the Philippines
Defunct radio stations in Metro Manila
Internet radio stations in the Philippines
Radio stations established in 1986
Radio stations disestablished in 2008